Gilbert Stringer (18 March 1910 – 20 May 1991) was a New Zealand cricketer. He played in four first-class matches for Canterbury and Wellington from 1933 to 1944.

References

External links
 

1910 births
1991 deaths
New Zealand cricketers
Canterbury cricketers
Wellington cricketers
Cricketers from Christchurch